The Devotion of Suspect X is a 2017 Chinese mystery-thriller film based on the novel, The Devotion of Suspect X, written by Keigo Higashino. The film is second film directed by  Alec Su, and stars Wang Kai, Zhang Luyi, and Ruby Lin. The film was released in China and in North America on March 31, 2017.

Plot
Shi Hong is a brilliant mathematics teacher who is a recluse but likes the active company of his neighbor, divorcee Chen Jing and her young daughter through the thin walls. When Fu Jian, Chen Jing's abusive ex-husband, suddenly shows up trying to extort money from Chen Jing, threatening both her and her daughter, the situation spirals out of control and Fu Jian is killed. Shi Hong offers to help Chen Jing and her daughter cover up the crime, but when his former classmate and police consultant, Tang Chuan, becomes involved in investigating the murder, Shi Hong must betray his friend's trust and involve himself in a dangerous cat-and-mouse game that reveals the depths of his feelings for Chen Jing and her daughter. Tang Chuan catches him but only to later understand it was on his own terms and resumes their teenage years friendship which was based on mathematics.

Cast
Wang Kai as Tang Chuan 
Zhang Luyi as Shi Hong
Ruby Lin as Chen Jing
Hou Minghao as young Tang Chuan 
Yan Xujia as young Shi Hong
Deng Enxi as Chen Xiaoxin

Soundtrack 
"Innocent" ("清白"), performed by Kit Chan. Alec Su, the film's director, handwrote the subtitles of the lyrics for the music video.

Box office
The Chinese adaptation of Japanese crime thriller The Devotion of Suspect X maintained strongly in second place with $29.34m for $52.66m after 10 days.

Awards and nominations

References

External links

Official weibo (Chinese): 电影嫌疑人x的献身官微

2017 films
Films based on Japanese novels
Films based on mystery novels
Films based on works by Keigo Higashino
Films about mathematics
Chinese mystery thriller films
2010s mystery thriller films
Beijing Enlight Pictures films
Films directed by Alec Su
Films scored by Michiru Ōshima
2010s Mandarin-language films